Michael Johannes Malmin Tyllesen (born 27 August 1973) is a Danish former competitive figure skater. He is the 1997 Skate Canada International bronze medalist, a two-time Piruetten champion, and a two-time Nordic champion.

Career 
Tyllesen was a member of Gladsaxe Skøjteløber Forening. He also trained in Edmonton and Lake Arrowhead, California, and worked with choreographers Lorna Brown and Igor Bobrin.

Tyllesen's career-best ISU Championship result, sixth, came at the 1993 European Championships in Helsinki, Finland. He served as Denmark's flag bearer at the 1994 Winter Olympics in Lillehammer, Norway; he finished 13th after placing 13th in the short and 12th in the free skate.

Tyllesen finished ninth at the 1998 Winter Olympics in Nagano and 13th at the 1998 World Championships in Minneapolis.

After retiring from competition in 2000, Tyllesen performed in ice shows for nine years and then became a coach in Denmark. He is the head coach at Tårnby Skøjteklub.

Programs

Results
GP: Champions Series / Grand Prix

References

External links
 Figure skating corner profile

Danish male single skaters
Living people
1973 births
Olympic figure skaters of Denmark
Figure skaters at the 1994 Winter Olympics
Figure skaters at the 1998 Winter Olympics
Sportspeople from Frederiksberg